Pseudochromis ransonneti, the Karimunjawa dottyback, is a species of ray-finned fish from the Western Pacific Ocean, which is a member of the family Pseudochromidae.

Entymology
The fish is named for in honor of Eugen von Ransonnet-Villez (1838-1926), an Austrian diplomat, painter, lithographer, biologist and explorer, who sent a collection of fishes from Singapore, including the type specimen of this one.

References

ransonneti
Taxa named by Franz Steindachner
Fish described in 1870